The State Council of Higher Education for Virginia (SCHEV) is the Commonwealth's coordinating body for higher education. SCHEV was established by the Governor and General Assembly in 1956. Its mission, which is outlined in the Code of Virginia (§23.1-200), is "to promote the development of an educationally and economically sound, vigorous, progressive, and coordinated system of higher education in the Commonwealth of Virginia."

Director 
Peter A. Blake joined SCHEV as Interim Executive Director on April 1, 2011, a position that was made permanent in January 2012. A former Virginia Secretary of Education, Blake previously worked at SCHEV as an Associate Director overseeing higher education analyses in the areas of faculty and staff compensation, higher education funding policies, academic libraries, distance learning and instructional technology, and student financial aid. He left SCHEV in 1999 to serve as the Legislative Fiscal Analyst for the Virginia General Assembly's House Appropriations Committee.

List of directors 

 Belinda C. Anderson
 Peter A. Blake

Location 
SCHEV is located on the 9th floor of the James Monroe Building in downtown Richmond.

External links
 State Council of Higher Education for Virginia, Code of Virginia, Title 23.1, Chapter 2

Educational administration
State agencies of Virginia
Public education in Virginia
1956 establishments in Virginia